Gen:Lock (stylized as gen:LOCK) is an American animation computer-animated science fiction streaming television series created by Gray Haddock and produced by Rooster Teeth. It is set in a dystopian future Earth where an international coalition known as The Polity fights a hostile, autocratic invading force known as The Union. The show follows the gen:LOCK program and its members, who participate in the development and testing of an experimental technology which allows for individuals with unique mental make ups to have their minds uploaded to giant suits of mecha armor called "Holons".

Cast and characters

Main cast

gen:LOCK team
 Michael B. Jordan as Julian Chase, a Vanguard pilot and "All-American guy" from Brooklyn. After losing much of his body in the Battle of New York at the start of the war, Julian is recruited into the gen:LOCK program and becomes the first successful Holon pilot. Because his physical body is confined to a preservation tank, he mostly interacts with others through holographic projections or his Holon. As the most experienced pilot, Julian helps Weller form the rest of the team and assumes a leadership role. Julian pilots a Holon with teal markings which is later equipped with thrusters, wings, and propellers mounted on its back, allowing for long-range flight. It is later upgraded with a sleeker and more aerodynamic design. In addition to a rifle for offense, it can launch two large rockets attached to the wings, and missile batteries in both of its forearms. Julian's call sign is "Chaser".
 Maisie Williams as Cameron 'Cammie' MacCloud, a Scottish hacker and the youngest gen:LOCK recruit at 17 years old. Cameron uses a Holon with green markings with a set of flaps on her head that resemble rabbit ears and equipped with two drones that provide near perfect 360 degree awareness of her surroundings and aim assistance. It is equipped with two handguns, and can automatically dispense and position two handgun magazines to its back for quick reloading. Cammie later upgrades her Holon to look like a rabbit with hind-legs and rabbit-like ears that function like satellite dishes, allowing for long-range sensory capabilities. It is the shortest in comparison to the other Holons, but is shown to be the most agile. Cammie's Holon can deploy five drones that are equipped with an antenna system and machine gun turrets. Smaller drones that allow for remote hacking can be deployed. It is equipped with a new set of dual pistols and disk-shaped remote explosive devices. Williams drew comparisons between Cammie and her Game of Thrones character Arya Stark, noting Cammie's naivety is comparable to Arya's at the start of Thrones: she jokingly remarked that Cammie would win in a fight between the two. Cammie's callsign is "Trixx".
 Kōichi Yamadera as Kazu Iida, a transfer from the Japanese military, where he was demoted from the rank of Sergeant to kitchen duty on grounds of insubordination. Kazu uses a Holon with red markings, equipped with dual katana-like swords, and benefits from additional armor in comparison to the other Holons. It is later outfitted with the most armor and is visibly the bulkiest in comparison to the other Holons. The shoulder armor is capable of unfolding to offer more protection to the upper body. Its dual swords have been replaced with a single hooked greatsword with a telescopic handle and blade for ease of storage, along with a compact shotgun to better complement his close-quarter fighting style. Cammie based Kazu's upgraded Holon on a fictional manga he read called RoboShogun. Kazu exclusively speaks Japanese throughout the series, however AR contact lenses with automatic translation, and similar translation software in the Holons allow the team to communicate without issue. Kazu's callsign is "Shogun".
 Golshifteh Farahani as Yasamin 'Yaz' Madrani, an Iranian fighter pilot who, after accidentally getting her family captured and possibly killed by the Union, defected to the Polity. Wary of her intentions, the Polity held her in the Mesa Detention Center until Weller requested she be released to join the gen:LOCK program after Chase, but before the rest of the team. Yaz pilots a Holon with yellow markings equipped with wrist-mounted beam weapons and two submachine guns, later upgraded to a sleeker design with thrusters and a pair of collapsible wings, allowing the short-range flight capability. It is equipped with a pair of new submachine guns and beam weapons that can be fired from her eyes and wrists. Yaz's callsign is "Huma".
 Asia Kate Dillon as Val/entina 'Val' Romanyszyn, a former Russian covert agent disillusioned by years of fighting a losing war against the Union in Eastern Europe. Initially intent on abandoning the war to live a life of leisure, they are convinced to join gen:LOCK in order to continue helping people. Val/entina is genderfluid, going by the name "Val" when male-presenting and "Valentina" when female-presenting. Val/entina uses a Holon with purple markings and an energy-based sniper rifle for combat. Their Holon is later upgraded with a lighter armor than the others, possessing a retractable cloak that allows for virtual invisibility, and a wrist-mounted grappling hook strong enough to support the Holon's weight. It is equipped with a new sniper rifle and a single-edged short sword for close-quarter combat. Val/entina's callsign is "Wraith". Actress Tatiana Maslany was approached for the role due to her experience playing a trans character on Orphan Black, but turned the role down and insisted the producers cast an actual gender non-conforming actor in the role, which led the team to Dillon.

Other main characters
 David Tennant as Dr. Rufus Weller, a scientist from the Polity's Experimental Science Unit and creator of the gen:LOCK program. 
 Tennant also voices Caliban a.k.a. 'Cal', Weller's personal AI assistant, whose mind is an early copy of Weller's.
 Dakota Fanning as Miranda Worth, a Strider pilot and Chase's girlfriend prior to the war, conflicted by his return after he was presumed dead for four years. Originally light hearted and cheerful, she becomes battle hardened, battle-weary and scarred in the years after losing Chase. Her callsign is "Tempest".
 Monica Rial as Col. Raquel Marin, the leader of the Vanguard (the Polity's military).
 Blaine Gibson as Robert Sinclair, a Vanguard Specialist selected by Weller for the gen:Lock program. Sinclair was presumed dead after a Union imposter (also voiced by Gibson) attempted to steal a Holon using his identity, but a post-credits scene in Season 1 reveals he survived his attempted abduction and is trying to escape Union territory. In Season 2, it is revealed that Sinclair is the leader of a resistance movement, the Proletariat, and defected from the Polity after discovering their dark secrets and disagreeing with their methods.
 Gray Haddock as Lieutenant Leon August (Season 1), the leader of Miranda's strider unit. Though gen:LOCK compatible, he is too old to safely upload to a Holon without causing brain damage, and thus settles for training the rest of the team. After surviving the Union's attack on the Anvil, Leon returns linked to Sinclair's supposed Holon along with the Polity to help the heroes defeat Nemesis, but at the cost of sustaining brain damage from incompatibility and subsequently going under a coma, eventually dying from his injuries six months later.
 Miles Luna as Miguel 'Migas' Garza, a mecha mechanic and one of Chase's closest friends who bonds with the gen:LOCK team.
 G.K. Bowes as Driana 'Dri' Chase, Julian's sister and aspiring pop idol. Assumed dead in the Battle of New York, she is shown to be alive in "Training Daze".
 Chad James as Jodie Brennan, a strider pilot who has an unspecified relationship with Miranda after Chase's presumed death.
 Michael B. Jordan as Nemesis (Season 1), a mecha controlled by the original mind of Julian Chase that was captured by the Union and was subjected to extreme mental torment due to far exceeding his Uptime and is bent on killing what he sees as his copy. His Holon has four arms with clawed fingertips and is later upgraded with heavier armor, making him appear much bulkier, and is able to control Union Nanotech for offense, defense, and limited self-repair. He also has spider-like legs attached to his back including 4 mechanical tentacles and three thrusters giving him flight capability.
 Angus Sampson as Brother Tate (Season 2-), the figurehead of the Union.

Minor characters
 Lindsay Jones as Simone 'Razzle' Rasmussen (Season 1), a fighter pilot and Julian's former squadmate in the 'Silver Falcons' unit. She was killed in action during the battle against the Union in New York City.
 Shari Belafonte as Roberta Chase, Julian's mother.
 Lara Toner Haddock as Patricia Bartlet-Young, President of the Polity.
 Lawrence Sonntag as ABLE, the Anvil's AI unit and Colonel Raquel Marin's assistant.
 SungWon Cho as Heng Li 'Henry' Wu, a scientist who is kidnapped by the Union and then rescued by the gen:LOCK team. He works for RTASA, which becomes gen:LOCK's new base of operations. SungWon Cho also voices Chris, who is Robert Sinclair's boyfriend.
 Anisha Nagarajan as Dr. Fatima Jha, a scientist working at RTASA and Dr. Weller's ex-wife.
 Matt Hullum (season 1) and Kiff VandenHeuvel (season 2) as Marc Holcroft, the principal investor in the ESU and RTASA, and one of the early collaborators on the gen:LOCK project. In reality, he's a selfish, callous, manipulative sociopath who plays both sides of the Polity and Union for his own ends.

Comic characters
 General Genji Anno, the prideful leader of the Polity forces in Japan. He has an antagonistic relationship with his former subordinate Kazu due to their contrasting personalities.
 Toshiro Iida, Kazu's father
 Zariku Iida, Kazu's mother
 Sycorax, a treacherous entity (two women and a wyvern) from the game Siege bent on taking over the world. They were once affiliated with Dr. Weller as part of the gen:LOCK project, but were presumed dead when their minds were corrupted and bodies disintegrated in front of him.
 Kayden Cartwright, creator of Siege
 Commander Carlyle, the leader of an invading Union force sent to Osaka. During the Union's and Sycorax's attack, he appears on the screens denouncing the Polity and the people's efforts, declaring destruction and control of Japan.

Production and release
The concept for Gen:LOCK originated in 2017 as a cautionary tale about cultural warfare. It was announced with a brief teaser at RTX Austin 2018. A trailer was shown at New York ComicCon 2018, where it was described as, "grounded science-fiction" in the tradition of mecha anime such as Gundam and Tom Clancy novels but with a look and feel reminiscent of RWBY.

Gray Haddock cited several anime titles as inspirations, including Ghost in the Shell, Gundam, Aldnoah Zero, Kiznaiver, and the writing of Gen Urobuchi.

In May 2018, it was announced that Michael B. Jordan would voice lead character Julian Chase, the news of which accelerated the signings of other voice talents. Gen:Lock is Rooster Teeth Animation's first series that allowed members that are part of the Screen Actors Guild‐American Federation of Television and Radio Artists (SAG-AFTRA) like Jordan, Dakota Fanning, and David Tennant joining in. Jordan's production company, Outlier Society Productions, co-produces the show. In July 2018, Austin-based writer Evan Narcisse joined the writing staff of Gen:LOCK.

For the first four months, the team animated the show without the actors’ voices recorded. Haddock performed every voice for the first few episodes himself, hoping his direction would match later.

Initially advertised for release in 2018, the show's final release date of January 26, 2019 was announced at New York Comic-Con. It released on Rooster Teeth's FIRST platform. Following a mysterious tweet from Rooster Teeth's Twitter account on December 21, the first episode of the series was broadcast in a surprise screening on the company's live streaming service the next day. On January 9, it was revealed that along with the Volume 6 finale of RWBY,  the first two episodes would premiere on the 26th, and that only the first episode would be available for free and all subsequent episodes would be exclusive to Rooster Teeth FIRST members. The remaining six episodes released on a weekly basis.

Reruns of the first season aired from August 3, 2019, to September 21, 2019, on Adult Swim's Toonami programming block, with episodes edited down to approximately 23 minutes to fit into a standard time slot. During the period, Gen:LOCK was either the second most viewed Adult Swim show after Dragon Ball Super, or third after Dr. Stone. Its best performance was Episode 6, which ranked at ninth among all shows on September 7.

At New York Comic Con 2018, Rooster Teeth announced a partnership with DC Comics to publish RWBY and Gen:LOCK comics starting in 2019. The Gen:Lock comic is written by Collin Kelly and Jackson Lanzing, while drawn by Carlo Barbieri.

On October 24, 2019, it was announced that the show had been renewed for a second season set to be released on HBO Max for its first 90 days before it is released on Rooster Teeth for FIRST members. This was confirmed in 2020 by Forbes.

On October 22, 2021, it was revealed that the show's second season would premiere on HBO Max on November 4, and on Rooster Teeth FIRST on March 23, 2022. As of April 1, 2022, All episodes are available on Rooster Teeth FIRST. Animation was handled by Canadian studio Bardel Entertainment.

Episodes

Series overview

Character reveal teasers
Prior to release, Rooster Teeth released four "Character Reveal Teasers." These teasers, set during episode one's four-year time-skip, were framed from the perspective of Dr. Rufus Weller (David Tennant) and his continued phone conversations with Colonel Raquel Marin (Monica Rial), discussing the new recruits for the gen:LOCK program.

Season 1 (2019)

Season 2 (2021)

Reception

Season 1
Reviews for season 1 of Gen:LOCK were largely positive. Critics praised the series as a clear step forward for the company behind Red vs. Blue and RWBY, highlighting the animation quality and the performances of the lead cast, as well as sharp dialogue by writers Gray Haddock and Evan Narcisse. The series' use of action and spectacle, while praised for its quality, was criticized as taking precedence over storytelling, with Comic Book Resources' Reuben Baron noting it made the series feel unfocused. Writing for Inverse, Eric Francisco observed that at least for the first five episodes the series lacked a clear antagonist which made the stakes of the story difficult to perceive, but overall praised the series as a much more mature outing for Rooster Teeth than RWBY. Austen Goslin from Polygon observed that the series was at its strongest when the characters were the focus and that the fight sequences, though well-choreographed, took time away from those interactions. However, Goslin conceded that the series was a strong addition to the mecha genre. Tristan Gallant of anime review series Glass Reflection noted the series seemed to be following some recognizable tropes and story beats, but praised its entertainment value and overall production quality, noting its animation was superior to other Western-animated 3D shows like The Dragon Prince (which uses a similar reduced framerate as part of its style).

Mike Toole of Anime News Network offered a more mixed opinion after Season 1's conclusion. Toole praised the show's casting and use of classic science fiction tropes, but noted that despite enough material to keep audiences engaged the first season lacked a truly compelling conflict to drive the story. Toole expressed that a second season would require a story that matched the ambition of the series' characters and core concept in order for it to become a truly great show. "Until then, gen:LOCK feels just a little bit like a prototype."

Fan reaction to Gen:LOCK prior to release was largely skeptical: potential viewers found the initial trailers underwhelming due to a lack of information on what the series was about, and many expressed fatigue with the show's marketing in the months leading up to release. Some mecha anime fans found the concepts unoriginal, with an opinion piece published on Forbes a few days before the premiere claiming that the designs were generic and encouraging viewers to watch something else. The reception was much more positive following release, with several of the more skeptical fans admitting the first episode was all it took to win them over.

Gen:LOCK was nominated for best animated series at 9th Streamy Awards.

Season 2
Mark Millen of CBR reviewed the first episode of the show's second season, saying it keeps the spirit of the series intact, even with a different writing crew, and further described the show as a "distinctive animated experience" which has "mental illness, trauma recovery, technological intimacy and identity" at its center. Cassandra Feltus of Black Girl Nerds said that fans would enjoy the second season. She praised the characters for having distinct personalities, who then have to deal with their trauma. Feltus also raised the argument that the series is an introduction to the world of anime due to its inspirations like Ghost in the Shell. Feltus praised the show's design calling the second season "as entertaining and compelling as its first" and was amazed by the action sequences.

Reviews of the second season following its conclusion were mixed. Aaron Phillips of the But Why Tho podcast praised the animation and character developments but called it a disappointing follow-up to the first season, claiming the narrative arc seemed more appropriate for a fifth season rather than a second. Audience response leaned negative, with a 25% score on Rotten Tomatoes: users indicated a drop in quality between the first and second season.

Related media
gen:LOCK: The tie-in comic book series was originally announced by DC Comics in July 5th, 2019, to be launched digitally in September 2019. Described as "Season 1.5", the series deals with the team heading to Japan to breakup a Union blockade. The series was published digitally for 14 chapters, which were eventually collected in trade paperback form. In advance of the trade paperback's release, a series of 7 single-issue print comics had been planned. Issue 7 was reportedly cancelled by the publisher; however, copies of issue 6 have since appeared in online marketplaces, such as eBay.
 
On October 6, 2020, a novel based on the series called "gen:Lock: Storm Warning" was released, written by Melissa Scott.

In July 2021, Hi-Rez launched a Battle Pass Event Paladins Crossover, including five skins based on characters from the show.

References

External links

DC page: G2019

2019 web series debuts
2021 web series endings
2010s American adult animated television series
2020s American adult animated television series
2010s American LGBT-related animated television series
2020s American LGBT-related animated television series
American adult animated web series
American adult animated action television series
American adult animated adventure television series
American adult animated science fiction television series
American adult computer-animated television series
Anime-influenced Western animated television series
English-language television shows
HBO Max original programming
Rooster Teeth
Television series by Otter Media
Toonami